Jody Alan Cundy,  (born 14 October 1978) is an English cyclist and former swimmer. He has represented Great Britain at seven Summer Paralympics winning eight Gold, one Silver and three Bronze medals across swimming and cycling events. He has also competed in multiple World Championships, winning 22 world titles (19 in Cycling and 3 in Swimming.) The most recent coming at the World Championships in Saint-Quentin-en-Yvelines, France October 2022.

Personal history
Cundy was born in Wisbech, Cambridgeshire to Alan, a fitter-welder, and Ann, an accountancy clerk. He grew up in Norfolk along with his younger brother Ashley. Cundy was born with a deformed foot, which was amputated when he was three years old.

Cundy attended the University of Hertfordshire, based in Hatfield, where he was also a member of the town's swimming club. On 12 October 2012, Cundy was awarded an Honorary Doctorate from Anglia Ruskin University with a ceremony at the Cambridge Corn Exchange.

Swimming career
When Cundy was aged 10, his parents met a disabled girl's parents and they discussed disability swimming. After some research, Cundy's parents decided to get him involved. Cundy showed early potential, breaking swimming records for his age group.
After become a leading member of his local King's Lynn club's team, he made his international debut at the Swimming World Championships in Malta in 1994. He improved his personal best by four seconds and won the world 100m butterfly title. However, he later said that he was "never a naturally gifted swimmer. I don't have the build. I just worked very hard: 10 or 11 two-hour sessions in the pool each week, and weights and core strength work – 30 hours-plus a week." 
He later represented Great Britain three times in swimming at the Paralympic Games from 1996 to 2004, winning three gold and two bronze medals.
After a 2004 Athens Paralympic Games that landed him a bronze medal, Cundy joined the high-performance swimming centre at Swansea.

Cycling career
In 2006, he switched from swimming to cycling, competing at international events in the C4 disability category. Winning gold in the kilo in his debut at the 2006 world championships, he repeated this feat in 2007 and 2009 also taking the team sprint title at both events. Since switching to cycling he has been based in Manchester where he trains with the Great Britain Cycling squad.

Representing Great Britain at the 2008 Summer Paralympics in Beijing, Cundy broke the world record on the way to winning the gold in the 1km Time Trial with a time of 1 minute 5.466 seconds. This made him one of only a handful of athletes that have become Paralympic champion in two different sports.

He was selected for the Great Britain team at the 2012 Summer Paralympics. He was expected to win gold in the C4/5 Men's 1 km time trial, but slipped shortly after starting, which he argued was due to the starting gate not working properly. The technical delegate of the International Cycling Union, Louis Barbeau, disagreed, refusing him a restart. Cundy then erupted into a rage, swearing and throwing water bottles. He later apologised to the crowd, though made clear that he still disagreed with the decision.
He won bronze in the C4 men's 4 km pursuit, racing Diego Gomez of Colombia. In the first kilometre of the race, he clocked a time of 1:05.317 in the heats, which would have won the 1 km time trial.

Cundy aimed to qualify for the England team for the 2014 Commonwealth Games, but he abandoned this hope after placing fifth among English competitors and eighth overall in the 1km time trial at the 2013 British National Track Championships, despite setting a new personal best and a world record for the C4 category. Subsequently, he won gold at the 2014 UCI Para-cycling Track World Championships in Aguascalientes in the C4 1 km time trial, earning his ninth world title and breaking his own world record with a time of 1:01.466.

In 2015 and 2016, Cundy remained undefeated in the 1 km TT. In addition to his 2016 Kilo Gold Medal, he became a double world champion with British Cycling teams mates Louis Rolfe and Jon-Allan Butterworth winning in a new world record time at the World Championships in Montichari, Italy in March.

At the 2016 Summer Paralympics in Rio, Cundy regained his Kilo Paralympic title in a new Paralympic record of 1:04.492 which when factored for C4 athletes gave a winning time of 1:02.473
In the final track cycling event of the 2016 Summer Paralympics Cundy teamed up with Louis Rolfe and Jon-Allan Butterworth to take the Mixed Team Sprint C1-5 gold medal in a world-record time of 48.635.

Cundy was appointed Member of the Order of the British Empire (MBE) in the 2009 New Year Honours for services to disabled sport, and Officer of the Order of the British Empire (OBE) in the 2017 New Year Honours for services to cycling and swimming.

At the 2020 Paralympic games in Tokyo, he took home the Silver in the C4-5 1 km Time Trial behind Spanish C5 Athlete Alfonso Cabello. Two days later he teamed up with Kadeena Cox and Jaco van Gass to take Gold, in a new WR time of, 47.579 in the C1-5 Mixed 750m Team Sprint ahead of the current world champions China.

In winning his silver medal at the Tokyo Paralmypics he became the first male Great British athlete to medal at 7 consecutive Paralympic Games.

Cundy was appointed Commander of the Order of the British Empire (CBE) in the 2022 New Year Honours for services to cycling.

References

External links

 
 
 

1978 births
Living people
People from Wisbech
Alumni of the University of Hertfordshire
People associated with Anglia Ruskin University
English male swimmers
English male cyclists
Paralympic swimmers of Great Britain
Paralympic cyclists of Great Britain
Paralympic gold medalists for Great Britain
Paralympic silver medalists for Great Britain
Paralympic bronze medalists for Great Britain
Swimmers at the 1996 Summer Paralympics
Swimmers at the 2000 Summer Paralympics
Swimmers at the 2004 Summer Paralympics
Cyclists at the 2008 Summer Paralympics
Cyclists at the 2012 Summer Paralympics
Medalists at the 1996 Summer Paralympics
Medalists at the 2000 Summer Paralympics
Medalists at the 2004 Summer Paralympics
Medalists at the 2008 Summer Paralympics
Medalists at the 2012 Summer Paralympics
Commanders of the Order of the British Empire
World record holders in paralympic swimming
UCI Para-cycling World Champions
English amputees
Medalists at the 2016 Summer Paralympics
Paralympic medalists in cycling
Paralympic medalists in swimming
Medalists at the 2020 Summer Paralympics
Cyclists at the 2020 Summer Paralympics
British male butterfly swimmers
British male backstroke swimmers
S10-classified Paralympic swimmers